Tyler Boyd may refer to:

Tyler Boyd (American football) (born 1994), American wide receiver
Tyler Boyd (soccer) (born 1994), American soccer player